Hronec is a village and municipality in Brezno District, in the Banská Bystrica Region of central Slovakia.

History
In historical records, the village was first mentioned as Hronecz in 1357, when it was the dominion of Lypche Solienses. In 1390, it was mentioned as Horonecz. As Louis I of Hungary already in 1357 gave to the Royal forester's son - called Pál - the right of scultetus, in 1405 it was referred as Plantatio Pauli. In 1424 Kysgaran, in 1547 Ranitz and in the 19th century usually Rhonic was used. After, the official name was until 1886 Rónicz, when it was changed to Kisgaram. Eventually, as part of Czechoslovakia, Hronec became the official name.

Notable people
Alajos Szokolyi – Hungarian sportsperson, bronze medalist at the first modern Olympics

Genealogical resources

The records for genealogical research are available at the state archive "Statny Archiv in Banska Bystrica, Slovakia"

 Roman Catholic church records (births/marriages/deaths): 1679-1909 (parish A)
 Greek Catholic church records (births/marriages/deaths): 1775-1928 (parish B)
 Lutheran church records (births/marriages/deaths): 1784-1927 (parish B)

See also
 List of municipalities and towns in Slovakia

References

External links
https://web.archive.org/web/20070513023228/http://www.statistics.sk/mosmis/eng/run.html
http://www.e-obce.sk/obec/hronec/hronec.html
https://web.archive.org/web/20091112184504/http://www.hronec.sk/
Surnames of living people in Hronec

Villages and municipalities in Brezno District